Shebaa is a  town on the south-eastern tip of Lebanon. It has a largely Sunni Muslim population of 25,000 people. It lies adjacent to the contested Shebaa farms—which sit between the town and the Golan Heights. Before 1967, residents of Shebaa farmed in the disputed Shebaa farms territory.

History

In 1838, Eli Smith noted  Chebaa's population as being Sunni Muslim and Greek Orthodox Christians.

Following the 1982 invasion Chebaa became part of the Israel’s security zone with Norwegian soldiers from UNIFIL stationed in the area. One night, late January 1989, the Israeli backed SLA expelled 40 villagers, ordering them not to return. This brought the total over a period of several months to around 80. In the words of the UNIFIL spokesperson those expelled were “mostly women and children”. There was outrage when a Norbat Colonel compared IDF actions to those of the Nazis.

As of 2015, the town housed several thousand Syrian refugees.

Educational Establishments

References

Bibliography

External links
 Localliban: Centre de resource sur le developpement local: www.localiban.org

Populated places in the Israeli security zone 1985–2000
Populated places in Hasbaya District